BlueLink may refer to:
 BlueLink (software), suite of campaign management mobile apps designed to register, organize, and mobilize liberal voters
 BlueLink Information Network, a virtual network of Bulgarian non-governmental organizations and activists